Lisa Morpurgo Dordoni (19 May 1923 in Soncino (CR) – 9 May 1998 in Milan) was a writer and astrologer.

Biography
Lisa Morpurgo gained a degree in literature at the Università Statale di Milano presenting a thesis on Maurice Barrès (thesis).
She started to be interested in astrology while working as a translator for book publishers.

Morpurgowas first intrigued by astrology while translating the French book " Lo Zodiaco - Segreti e sortilegi " by François-Régis Bastide
The translation of this book about zodiacal signs peculiarities awakened her curiosity for astrology, a matter up to that moment so distant from her cultural background. 
Thanks to her thorough study of this new form of knowledge she had been able to sketch the zodiacal map of some of her remarkable friends - mostly writers, such as Eugenio Montale, Dino Buzzati, Guido Piovene, Gabriel García Márquez, Mario Vargas Llosa - an interesting work that considerably improved her knowledge and urged her to unveil the reasons why zodiacal mechanisms seemed to effectively work.

From this starting point on, an impressive amount of discoveries took place: she could no longer accept the obsolete and fideistic dogmas of traditional astrology. 
Therefore, she set on the search for those astrological mechanisms – based both on observation and science - which lay under each phenomenon. 
Her unprecedented practice meant a real revolution in astrology as it had been considered up to that time and opened new roads to research, applied with seriousness and thoughtfulness. 
She was the starter of a new current of thought both through her lessons and her books, the real milestone for astrologers and for those interested in the zodiac.

In 1968, Morpurgo published her first novel, Madame andata e ritorno. 
In 1972, she published her first astrological book Introduzione all'astrologia e decifrazione dello Zodiaco, a real milestone for zodiac knowledge, that reached tens further editions, as a long seller, in several countries.
In 1975, she published Macbarath, a science-fiction novel which anticipated her future astrological discoveries.
In 1979, she published what was defined her most important astrological book Il convitato di pietra.
In 1988, she published her fourth novel : La noia di Priapo. 
Between 1983 and 1992, she published Lezioni di Astrologia in order to further her astrological theories: La natura dei segni, La natura dei pianeti, La natura delle case, La natura dei transiti.
Among other books, she wrote L'astrologia e l'amore and Bimbo astrologo.

In her theories, Morpurgo applied a logical and rational approach to astrology.
She revisited astrological theories reconfiguring the system of domiciles and exaltations of the planets.
This approach gave more value to astrological theories which suggested the existence of two more planets.
Morpurgo defined them as X-Demetra and Y-Eolo. 
X would signify the great female principal, in complementary opposition to the meaning of Pluto.
Y would signify the great ruler of long and slow time and low frequencies - lord of meteorological and geological phenomena, in complementary opposition to the meaning of Neptune.

Morpurgo organised and directed 12 congresses of astrological studies.
The first one in Laveno in 1976, others in Ferrara, Varese, Mantova, Verona, Riccione, the last one in 1993.

Before her death, Morpurgo decided to entrust the study material accumulated over time to her pupils and collaborators Gabriele Silvagni and Raffaella Vaccari.
Silvagni and Vaccari publicated the study material, making this documentation free and universally available with its whole considerable historical and scientific importance.

The main characteristic of Morpurgo's work was the attempt to link empirical observation to zodiacal symbology with the objective of denying or confirming astrological traditional beliefs and suppositions by means of rational observation of phenomena.

In a few words, we can say that Morpurgo achieved the complete zodiac deciphering on the basis of strict logical and geometrical principles, identifying all its components. But she was particularly brilliant at deciphering what was hidden inside that heavenly mechanism: the interpretation code of cosmic reality that, through two different zodiacal systems A and B (each with its two specific Zodiacs), completes the map of the real Cosmogony.

Dignities according to Lisa Morpurgo

References

External links

1923 births
1998 deaths
Italian women novelists
Italian astrologers
20th-century astrologers
20th-century Italian women writers
20th-century Italian novelists